Apopyllus is a genus of ground spiders that was first described by Norman I. Platnick & M. U. Shadab in 1984.

Species
 it contains ten species:
Apopyllus aeolicus Azevedo, Ott, Griswold & Santos, 2016 – Brazil
Apopyllus atlanticus Azevedo, Ott, Griswold & Santos, 2016 – Brazil
Apopyllus centralis Azevedo, Ott, Griswold & Santos, 2016 – Brazil
Apopyllus gandarela Azevedo, Ott, Griswold & Santos, 2016 – Brazil
Apopyllus huanuco Platnick & Shadab, 1984 – Peru
Apopyllus ivieorum Platnick & Shadab, 1984 – Mexico
Apopyllus malleco Platnick & Shadab, 1984 – Chile
Apopyllus now Platnick & Shadab, 1984 – Curaçao, Colombia
Apopyllus silvestrii (Simon, 1905) (type) – Peru, Bolivia, Brazil, Argentina, Chile
Apopyllus suavis (Simon, 1893) – Venezuela, Peru, Brazil, Argentina

References

Araneomorphae genera
Gnaphosidae
Spiders of South America